Unsettled is a Canadian drama television series, which premiered on APTN in 2021. Created by Jennifer Podemski and Hannah Moscovitch with the participation of Jeremy Podeswa as an executive producer, the series stars Cheri Maracle as Rayna Keetch, a First Nations woman whose life undergoes an upheaval when her husband Darryl (Brandon Oakes) loses his business, forcing them and their family to abandon their lives in Toronto and start over back on their home reserve.

The cast also includes Michaella Shannon, Joshua Odjick and Albert Owl.

References

External links 
 

2021 Canadian television series debuts
2020s Canadian drama television series
First Nations television series
Aboriginal Peoples Television Network original programming